Sinmi Island is a North Korean island in the Pansong Archipelago in West Korea Bay.

References

Islands of North Korea
North Pyongan